Allen Sinai is working as the chief global economist, strategist and president at Decision Economics, Inc. He won the Top Forecaster-Wall Street Journal Survey in 2006, as well as the USA Today Survey Top Forecaster in 2003 and 2005. Sinai has worked with policymakers across the globe, including in the United States, Japan, Europe and Asia, and is listed as an event speaker with the Milken Institute.

Education
BA 1961, University of Michigan
MA 1966, Northwestern University
PhD 1969, Northwestern University

References

External links

American economists
Living people
Year of birth missing (living people)
University of Michigan alumni